Dichostates muelleri is a species of beetle in the family Cerambycidae. It was described by Quedenfeldt in 1888. It is known from Democratic Republic of the Congo.

References

Crossotini
Beetles described in 1888
Endemic fauna of the Democratic Republic of the Congo